W. Keith Hall (born July 3, 1959) is an American politician and a Democratic member of the Kentucky House of Representatives representing District 93 until January 2015. He was defeated for renomination in the primary.

In 2016 he was convicted by the FBI of bribing a state inspector and identity theft and was jailed for seven years.

Education
Hall attended Pikeville College (now the University of Pikeville) and the University of Kentucky.

Elections
2012 Hall was unopposed for both the May 22, 2012 Democratic Primary and the November 6, 2012 General election, winning with 10,320 votes.
2000 When District 93 Representative Chris Ratliff left the Legislature and left the seat open, Hall won the 2000 Democratic Primary with 3,233 votes (55.4%) and was unopposed for the November 7, 2000 General election, winning with 7,561 votes.
2002 Hall was unopposed for both the 2002 Democratic Primary and also the November 5, 2002 General election, winning with 6,962 votes.
2004 Hall was challenged in the 2004 Democratic Primary, winning with 2,936 votes (83.5%) and was unopposed for the November 2, 2004 General election, winning with 10,119 votes.
2006 Hall unopposed for both the 2006 Democratic Primary and the November 7, 2006 General election, winning with 8,339 votes.
2008 Hall was unopposed for both the 2008 Democratic Primary and the November 4, 2008 General election, winning with 10,114 votes.
2010 Hall was challenged in the three-way May 18, 2010 Democratic Primary, winning with 5,667 votes (69.3%) and won the November 2, 2010 General election with 6,665 votes (78.8%) against Republican nominee Raul Urias.

References

External links
Official page at the Kentucky General Assembly

Keith Hall at Ballotpedia
W. Keith Hall at the National Institute on Money in State Politics

Place of birth missing (living people)
1959 births
Living people
Democratic Party members of the Kentucky House of Representatives
People from Pike County, Kentucky
University of Kentucky alumni
University of Pikeville alumni
Kentucky politicians convicted of crimes